The Trade Mark Extensible Markup Language (TM-XML) is an XML open standard for the trademark business and for the exchange of trademark information between the Industrial Property Offices and its partners or users.

Objectives
The initial objective was the definition of XML Standard for trademark information exchange. During the specifications and after the creation of WIPO Standard ST.66, other objectives have been added as following:
 
 Define XML Standards for Trade Mark Offices and Trade Mark Business
 Propose Useful Outcomes as Base for the Creation of WIPO Standards
 Define Trademark Web Service Standards
 Provide Examples of Implementations and Tools
 Share Experiences, Practices and Knowledge
 Promote Collaboration and Harmonization of Trade Mark Information and Knowledge Representations
 Prepare the Emerging Semantic Web for the Trade Mark Domain in the Intellectual Property Context (hTrademark Microformat, TM-RDF, TM-OWL)

History
TM-XML was defined by a working group created by the European Union Intellectual Property Office in June 2003. 8 draft versions for comment have been published (versions 0.1 to 0.7 and 1.0 Draft) before the version 1.0 Final published on 26 May 2006 on its website: https://web.archive.org/web/20060827113952/http://www.tm-xml.org/.

TM-XML Version 1.0 Final has been proposed as a base for the creation of a WIPO International Standard named ST.66 which has been adopted by the Standing Committee on Information Technologies / Standards and Documentation Working Group (SCIT/SDWG) during its 8th session on March 19–22, 2007 in Geneva.

Roadmap 2010-2015

See also
DS-XML : XML Standard for Design / Industrial Design

References
TM-XML 1.0 Final "TM-XML.org", TM-XML Working Group, May 26, 2006. Accessed August 16, 2007.
http://www.wipo.int/standards/en/pdf/03-66-01.pdf WIPO Standard ST.66 version 1.1 (Adoption of TM-XML 1.3)
Creating a 21st Century Public Agency, Prof. J.E.Fountain, R.Galindo-Dorado & J.Rothschild - National Center for Digital Government Paper

External links
 TM-XML Home Page
 TM-XML Specifications
 TM-XML Dictionary
 TM-XML Implementations
 TM-XML Tools and Examples

Industry-specific XML-based standards
XML markup languages
Brand management
Intellectual property organizations